Bodaghabad (also Romanized as Bodāghābād) is a village in Zarrin Rural District, Atamalek District, Jowayin County, Razavi Khorasan Province, Iran. At the 2006 census, its population was 607, in 167 families.

Amenities 
 The village has one elementary school and one high school, shared and private public showers, two mosques, one clinic and two holy shrines. An asphalt access road that joins Bodaghabad to Hokmabad, the nearest populated area. Bodaghabad is the center of Zarrin Rural District although it is not the largest village in the area. Drinking water, electricity and phone have been provided for this village and natural gas is planned to be provided in near future.

Culture 
In the recent decade, most traditional cultures have been forgotten. However, some traditions such as "Sar-e Hammam", "Nar Zadan", and "Chavoshi" still can be seen in marriage ceremonies. "Sar-e Hammam" is the last groom shower before starting his new life with his wife, people dancing outside of a public bathroom until the groom comes out and accompanies them in dancing. "Nar Zadan" is a tradition that bride, before going to her new home, throws a pomegranate behind and unmarried girls try to catch it, and the winner will be the next bride. "Chavoshi" is some traditional poems sung by old men, mostly in ceremonies. Traditional foods like "jeshvareh" and "lozzook" are still being prepared by old women in this village.

Population 
Based on the 2006 census, its population was 607 (167 families), 294 men and 303 women. According to this census, 378 out of 607 could read and write (203 men). 

Most residents have been relocated to bigger cities such as Mashhad and Tehran. In Iranian New Year Ceremony, they usually come back to village and its population goes up to more than 2000 for a short period.

References 

Populated places in Joveyn County